Events from the year 1542 in India.

Events
 Venkata I becomes the emperor of Vijayanagara Empire following the death of his father Achyuta Deva Raya
 Sadasiva Raya becomes the emperor of Vijayanagara Empire following the killing of his nephew Venkata I (until 1569)

Births
 6 October – Mariam uz-Zamani, Mughal emperess is born (dies 1623)
 14 October – Akbar (Jalal-ud-Din Muhammad Akbar), later Mughal emperor (dies 1605)

Deaths
 Achyuta Deva Raya emperor of Vijayanagara Empire (born 1529)

See also

 Timeline of Indian history